YETI is a journal focused on art, music and literature, based in Portland, Oregon. It is published by YETI Publishing, which has also published books by Lucy Sante, Tara Jane O'Neil and Jana Martin. YETI was founded in Seattle, Washington, by Mike McGonigal, author of the 33⅓ book on the My Bloody Valentine album Loveless, former editor of the '80s zine Chemical Imbalance, and a freelance writer (including contributions to Pitchfork). The magazine has featured various articles, interviews, artwork, poetry, novel excerpts, and more, from contributors including:

Jeff Mangum
Stacey Levine
Amy Gerstler
Dan Bejar
Richard Thompson
Harry Smith
Akron/Family

Each magazine is packaged with a CD compilation, featuring rare and/or previously unreleased music. Musical contributors to the magazine have included:

Iron and Wine (including their debut recording in YETI 1 and covers of Stereolab and The Flaming Lips in YETI 2.)
Elliott Smith
Death Cab for Cutie
The Shins
The Postal Service
Devendra Banhart
Destroyer

References

Literary magazines published in the United States
Magazines established in 2000
Magazines published in Portland, Oregon
Magazines published in Seattle
Music magazines published in the United States
Visual arts magazines published in the United States
2000 establishments in Washington (state)